Sarang-e Sofla (also Romanized as Sārang-e Soflá; also known as Sārang-e Pā’īn and Sārang) is a village in Kakhk Rural District, Kakhk District, Gonabad County, Razavi Khorasan Province, Iran. At the 2006 census, its population was 55, in 21 families.

References 

Populated places in Gonabad County